This is a list of the complete squads for the 2018 Americas Rugby Championship, an annual rugby union tournament contested by Argentina XV, Brazil, Canada, Chile, United States and Uruguay. Argentina XV are the defending champions.

Note: Number of caps and players' ages are indicated as of 27 January 2018 – the tournament's opening day.

Argentina XV
Argentina XV squad for the 2018 Americas Rugby Championship.

1 Following the start of the Super Rugby, Contepomi called up players as cover for their professional contingent.

Head coach:  Felipe Contepomi

Brazil
Brazil's 26-man squad for the 2018 Americas Rugby Championship.

1 After recovering from injury, Endy Willian rejoined the squad ahead of the second round.

2 After recovering from injury, Stefano Giantorno joined the squad for the final two rounds, whilst Daniel Lima joined the squad as injury cover.

Head coach:  Rodolfo Ambrosio

Canada
Canada's 35-man extended squad ahead of Canada's 2019 RWC Qualifiers against Uruguay (doubles up as ARC Round 1) and for the remaining ARC rounds post qualification matches.

1 Following the conclusion of the RWC Qualifiers between Canada and Uruguay, Canada called up players to cover the professional players returning to their European clubs.

2 Jones added Ryan Kotlewski and Cam Polson to the squad for the final two rounds.

3 Noah Barker was a late call up to the fourth round games against Argentina XV.

4Josh Thiel was added for the final round as injury cover.

Head coach:  Kingsley Jones

Chile
Chile's 45-man extended squad for the 2018 Americas Rugby Championship.

1 Nicolás Garafulic was a late addition to the training squad ahead of the ARC.

Head coach:  Mark Cross

United States
On 4 January 2018, newly appointed head coach Gary Gold announced a 39-man squad for the 2018 Americas Rugby Championship.

1 Chris Baumann rejoined the squad following his recovering stint with his club in Europe.

Head coach:  Gary Gold

Uruguay
On 11 January 2018, Meneses named a 26-man squad ahead of Uruguay's 2019 RWC Qualifiers against Canada (doubles up as ARC Round 1) and for the reaming ARC rounds post qualification matches.

1 Following the conclusion of the RWC Qualifiers between Canada and Uruguay, Uruguay called up several players to for the remaining games in the ARC.

Head coach:  Esteban Meneses

References

2018 squads
Rugby union squads